Kamil Majerník (born 25 October 1943) is a former Slovak football defender who played for Spartak Trnava. He earned four caps for the Czechoslovakia national football team.

International career
Majerník made four appearances for the full Czechoslovakia national football team.

Coaching career
Majerník coached Žilina and Nitra.

References

1943 births
Living people
Czechoslovak footballers
Slovak footballers
Czechoslovakia international footballers
FC Spartak Trnava players
Czechoslovak football managers
Slovak football managers
MŠK Žilina managers
FC Spartak Trnava managers
FC Nitra managers
Association football defenders
Sportspeople from Trnava